is Japanese voice actress and singer Maaya Uchida's 10th single, released on March 18, 2020.

Track listings

Charts

Album

References

2020 singles
2020 songs
J-pop songs
Japanese-language songs
Pony Canyon singles